Zeiraphera improbana, the larch needleworm moth, is a moth of the family Tortricidae. It is found in North America.

The wingspan is about 19 mm.

The larvae feed on Larix species.

External links
Image of adult

Olethreutinae
Moths described in 1863
Moths of North America